Champadevi is a rural municipality (gaunpalika) out of seven rural municipality located in Okhaldhunga District of Province No. 1 of Nepal. There are a total of 8 municipalities in Okhaldhunga in which 1 is urban and 7 are rural.

Palapu, Kalikadevi, Phediguth, Phulbari, Sagarmatha, Bilandu and Raniban, Sagarmatha which previously were all separate Village development committee merged to form this new local level body. Fulfilling the requirement of the new Constitution of Nepal 2015, Ministry of Federal Affairs and Local Development replaced all old VDCs and Municipalities into 753 new local level body (Municipality).

The rural municipality is divided into total 10 wards and the headquarter of this newly formed rural municipality is situated in Kalikadevi.

Demographics
At the time of the 2011 Nepal census, Champadevi Rural Municipality had a population of 18,661. Of these, 74.9% spoke Nepali, 12.3% Magar, 6.5% Tamang, 4.5% Newar, 1.1% Sherpa, 0.2% Maithili, 0.1% Baram and 0.4% other languages as their first language.

In terms of ethnicity/caste, 41.9% were Chhetri, 14.0% Magar, 6.8% Tamang, 6.3% Newar, 6.0% Hill Brahmin, 5.2% Sunuwar, 3.9% Damai/Dholi, 3.4% Kami, 3.1% Sarki and 9.4% others.

In terms of religion, 90.7% were Hindu, 7.9% Buddhist, 0.6% Christian, 0.2% Prakriti, 0.1% Muslim and 0.5% others.

References

External links
 Official website
 Final District 1-75 Corrected Last for RAJPATRA

Rural municipalities in Koshi Province
Populated places in Okhaldhunga District
Rural municipalities of Nepal established in 2017
Rural municipalities in Okhaldhunga District